Tom Monroe may refer to:

 Tom Monroe (disc golfer) (born 1947), American disc golfer
 Tom Monroe (actor) (1919–1993), American actor

See also
 Thomas Monroe (disambiguation)